Harris & Jacoby was a retail enterprise of Leopold Harris and the Jacoby Bros. in the 1870s in Los Angeles. For further information, see:
Leopold Harris
Jacoby Bros.

References

Defunct department stores based in Greater Los Angeles
1870s in California
1870 establishments in California